Seyal is a 2018 Indian Tamil-language action drama film written and directed by Ravi Abbulu in his comeback. The film stars Rajan Tejeshwar and Tharushi with Chammak Chandra, Renuka, Ramdoss and Vinodhini Vaidyanathan in supportive roles. Siddharth Vipin was hired to score music for the film while cinematography is handled by A. Elaiyaraja. The film was released on 18 May 2018 alongside Ilaiyaraaja musical combo 18.05.2009 and received average reviews from the audience.

Synopsis 
A youngster thrashes a gangster following a minor altercation. The gangster who suffers a loss of face, now seeks revenge.

Cast 

 Rajan Tejeshwar as Karthik
 Tharushi as Aarathi
 Chammak Chandra as Dandapani
 Vinodhini as Dandapani's wife
 Sai Dheena as Seva
 Jayabalan as Thimingalam
 Ramdoss
 Renuka as Karthik's mother

Production 
The film was announced by director Ravi Abbulu who made his comeback as film director after 17 long years as he last directed Vijay starrer Shahjahan in 2001. The director lamenting himself that he had to wait for a long time to direct films in order to choose good scripts. The director hired Telugu actor Rajan Tejeshwar in the male lead role who eventually made his Tamil film debut and the film is produced by Rajan Tejeshwar's father CR Rajan under his production banner CR Creations. Another Telugu film actor Chammak Chandra was also hired to play a supporting role in the film as the latter also made his Tamil film debut alongside the lead actor.

Soundtrack 
The music for the film is scored by Siddharth Vipin and the soundtrack was launched on 5 January 2018 consisting of four songs. Lalithanand penned lyrics for the songs. The album was well received by the audience.

References

External links 

 

2010s Tamil-language films
Films scored by Siddharth Vipin
2018 films
Indian romantic drama films
2018 action drama films
Indian action drama films
2018 romantic drama films